A primary instrument is a scientific instrument, which by its physical characteristics is accurate and is not calibrated against anything else. A primary instrument must be able to be exactly duplicated anywhere, anytime with identical results.

Example
Pressure. A U tube filled with water is a primary instrument as the water column differential is unchangeable as water is a basic physical substance. It is accurate due to its nature. Similarly a liquid in glass thermometer is a primary instrument as temperature change causes change in height of mercury column differential of which is unchangeable.

Secondary instruments
Secondary instruments must be calibrated against a primary standard. For example:

a dial bourdon tube type pressure gauge must be calibrated against a water or mercury U tube to assure good accuracy.
Time. The earth moving in its orbit is primary. Clocks must be calibrated against it.

Measurement